WMXF (1400 AM), known as "ESPN Asheville", is a sports radio station licensed to Waynesville, North Carolina which mostly airs the programming of WPEK in Asheville.

History
WHCC was the only radio station in Waynesville for many years. It went on the air with a formal opening September 10, 1947, operating on 1400 kHz with 250 watts of power. The station was licensed to Smoky Mountain Broadcasters, of which W. Curtiss Russ was president.

In the 1980s the format was adult contemporary. Later formats included oldies and Country.

In 1990, WQNS/WHCC owner KAT Communications of Myrtle Beach, South Carolina filed for Chapter 11, but the stations were doing well and no changes were planned.

The switch to the current call letters was made around 1998 or 1999, and the station began playing adult standards soon after that. By this time Blue Dolphin Communications owned the station.

WMXF, WQNQ and WQNS were purchased by Clear Channel Communications now iHeartMedia, Inc. in 2001.
The switch to talk was made in 2008, except for the morning show, which kept standards as part of the programming for a time.

On June 11, 2018, WMXF changed their format from a simulcast of news/talk-formatted WWNC 570 AM Asheville to a simulcast of ESPN sports-formatted WPEK 880 AM Fairview.

Current programming
WMXF simulcasts WPEK from Fairview. The station also features local sports programming such as Tuscola High School football games.

Previous logo

References

External links

MXF
Sports radio stations in the United States
IHeartMedia radio stations
1947 establishments in North Carolina
Radio stations established in 1947